Saint Anastasia or Santa Anastasia may refer to one of several saints named Anastasia. Otherwise it may refer to:

 Basilica di Sant'Anastasia al Palatino, basilica and titular church for cardinal-priests in Rome, Italy
 Cathedral of St. Anastasia (Zadar Cathedral), cathedral in Zadar, Croatia
 Sant'Anastasia, Verona, church in Verona, Italy
 St. Anastasia Island, Bulgarian islet
 Old St. Anastasia Catholic School, school in Fort Pierce, Florida, United States

See also 
 Anastasia of Serbia (Saint Anastasija)
 Escrava Anastacia (Slave Anastacia), Brazilian folk saint
 Sant'Anastasia (disambiguation)
 Anastasia (disambiguation)